The San Angelo Bandits were a professional indoor football team based in San Angelo, Texas. They were members of Champions Indoor Football (CIF) and the Lone Star Football League (LSFL). The Bandits began play in 2013 as an expansion team in the LSFL. They became members of the CIF when the LSFL and Champions Professional Indoor Football League (CPIFL) merged at the conclusion of the 2014 season. The Bandits played their home games at the Foster Communications Coliseum. The team folded following the 2016 season and were replaced by the expansion CenTex Cavalry.

The Bandits were the second indoor football team to call San Angelo home, following the San Angelo Stampede Express which played in the Intense Football League in 2004 and again from 2006 until 2008, the National Indoor Football League in 2005, and the Indoor Football League from 2009 and 2010.

History
After winning the 2014 regular season title, the Bandits clinched a playoff bye, but with the second-seeded Rio Grande Valley Sol suspended by the league, the Bandits played the third-seeded New Mexico Stars in the 2014 LSFL title game. The Bandits won the 2014 LSFL Championship Game by a score of 64-34.

Final roster

Head coaches

Season-by-season results

References

External links
 San Angelo Bandits official website

Lone Star Football League teams
American football teams in Texas
Sports in San Angelo, Texas
Champions Indoor Football teams
Defunct American football teams in Texas
American football teams established in 2012
American football teams disestablished in 2016
2012 establishments in Texas
2016 disestablishments in Texas